Presidential elections were held in the Maldives on 17 October 2003. The election took the form of a referendum on a single candidate nominated by the People's Majlis. Incumbent President Maumoon Abdul Gayoom was nominated for a sixth term, and was approved by 90% of voters.

Results

References

Maldives
Presidential elections in the Maldives
Presidential election
Maldives